Upajjana (ᐅᐸᔾᔭᓇ) formerly Beacon Island is an uninhabited island in the Qikiqtaaluk Region of Nunavut, Canada. It lies in the Cumberland Sound, at the mouth of the Pangnirtung Fiord, near Pangnirtung off Baffin Island's Cumberland Peninsula. Akulagok Island, Aupaluktok Island, Imigen Island, Kekerten Island, Kekertukdjuak Island, Tesseralik Island, Tuapait Island, and Ugpitimik Island are in the vicinity.

See also
 Anguttuaq, formerly Beacon Island
 Beacon Island (Hudson Strait)
 Beacon Island (Ungava Bay)

References

Islands of Baffin Island
Islands of Cumberland Sound
Uninhabited islands of Qikiqtaaluk Region